Ihor Plotko is a former Soviet and Ukrainian midfielder.

References

External links
 
 Lyubomyr Kuzmiak. When "Karpaty" won the bronze, I did not receive a medal. footboom.com. February 7, 2013. (interview, original source. Karpaty Lviv website).
 Profile at allplayers.in.ua

1966 births
Living people
Footballers from Dnipro
Soviet footballers
Ukrainian footballers
Ukrainian Premier League players
FC Dnipro players
FC Volyn Lutsk players
FC Elektrometalurh-NZF Nikopol players
FC Karpaty Lviv players
FC Mariupol players
FC Metalurh Zaporizhzhia players
FC Torpedo Zaporizhzhia players
FC Kryvbas Kryvyi Rih players
FC Oleksandriya players
Association football midfielders